Pseudopyrausta is a genus of moths of the family Crambidae. The genus was erected by Hans Georg Amsel in 1956.

Species
Pseudopyrausta acutangulalis (Snellen, 1875)
Pseudopyrausta craftsialis (Dyar, 1914)
Pseudopyrausta cubanalis (Schaus, 1920)
Pseudopyrausta marginalis (Dyar, 1914)
Pseudopyrausta minima (Hedemann, 1894)
Pseudopyrausta santatalis (Barnes & McDunnough, 1914)

References

Pyraustinae
Taxa named by Hans Georg Amsel
Crambidae genera